Command & Conquer (C&C) is a real-time strategy (RTS) video game franchise, first developed by Westwood Studios. The first game was one of the earliest of the RTS genre, itself based on Westwood Studios' influential strategy game Dune II and introducing trademarks followed in the rest of the series. This includes full-motion video cutscenes with an ensemble cast to progress the story, as opposed to digitally in-game rendered cutscenes. Westwood Studios was taken over by Electronic Arts in 1998 and closed down in 2003. The studio and some of its members were absorbed into EA Los Angeles, which continued development on the series.

History

After Westwood Studios developed the critically acclaimed Dune II, Computer Gaming World reported in 1993 that the company would not use the Dune license for Westwood's next strategy game "mostly because the programmers are tired of sand". The magazine stated that it would have "new terrain and enemies", and that "the design team is serious about doing a multi-player version".

Command & Conquer was released worldwide by Westwood in 1995. The plot is set sometime in the near future where the Earth becomes contaminated by a mysterious substance known as Tiberium. A global war ensues between the UN-formed Global Defense Initiative to contain it and the cult quasi-state revolutionary Brotherhood of Nod, led by the enigmatic Kane, which seeks to harness it. Highly successful, it was followed by Command & Conquer: Red Alert in 1996 which is set in an alternate universe where the Soviet Union wages war with the Allies. Developed as the prequel to the original, the Red Alert series was spun off into a separate, lighthearted and comic series, while the original game and its sequels became known as the "Tiberium" series, retaining its science fiction and serious tone. The first game is sometimes referred to as Tiberian Dawn as a result.

The original game was followed by Command & Conquer: Tiberian Sun in 1999 and its expansion pack Firestorm. In 2002, Westwood Studios released Command & Conquer: Renegade, a first-person shooter. Renegade was praised for its online features. A spin-off game in 2003, Command & Conquer: Generals, set in a more realistic near-future and featuring the United States, China and the Global Liberation Army was followed by an expansion pack, Zero Hour. Command & Conquer 3: Tiberium Wars was released in 2007 and followed by the expansion pack Kane's Wrath. Command & Conquer 4: Tiberian Twilight, released in 2010 as the conclusion to the Tiberium saga, received mixed reviews because of its deviation from traditional gameplay and story. The Red Alert series was continued by the 2000 title Command & Conquer: Red Alert 2, its expansion, Yuri's Revenge and Command & Conquer: Red Alert 3 in 2008, which introduced a third faction, the Empire of the Rising Sun, which resembles Japan with futuristic robotic technology.

The series is primarily developed for personal computers running Microsoft Windows, although some titles have been ported to various video game consoles and Apple Mac. Other games for platforms such as iOS and web-based have also been developed. As of July 2010, the Command & Conquer franchise consists of eleven games and eight expansion packs. The first three games of the series have been released as freeware to promote the successors. A free-to-play game, entitled Command & Conquer, was in development with the studio Victory Games. It was set to be the next game in the series and was expected to be released in 2013. However, after a short alpha period the game was cancelled, and Victory Games disbanded by EA. The Command & Conquer series has been a commercial success with over 30 million Command & Conquer games sold as of 2009.

Gameplay
The Command & Conquer titles are real-time strategy games, with the exception of the first-person shooter Command & Conquer: Renegade. A staple of the series is the parallel campaigns of various different factions to one central storyline. Games in the series also offered multiplayer game options, via LAN and modem connection. All games in the series have also offered online play, as well as "skirmish" matches in which players can face AI enemies.

All Command & Conquer real-time strategy games except Command & Conquer: Generals and its expansions have featured the "side bar" for navigation and control as opposed to many other similar games where the control bar is located on the bottom of the screen.

Command & Conquer gameplay typically requires the player to construct a base and acquire resources, in order to fund the ongoing production of various types of forces with which to assault and conquer the opponent's base. All available structures of the faction chosen by the player are constructed on-site at so-called "construction yard" - which typically begin as large-sized vehicles capable of deploying themselves into the aforementioned construction yards, called MCVs or Mobile Construction Vehicle. When a construction yard has finished building a new structure, the player can select a spot near to a preexisting structure in order to place it, where the prefabricated building will rapidly unfold in a distinctive manner.

In all games in the series except Command & Conquer: Generals and its expansion Zero Hour, funds are acquired by specialised "harvester" units which bring their cargo (Tiberium for the Tiberian series of games or ore or the more valuable gems for the Red Alert series) to a "refinery" structure. This in turn will convert the raw material into usable resources, expressed as credits. The raw materials themselves, in games released before Red Alert 2 as well as Command & Conquer 3 require storage space in the form of refineries and, in the case of excess, "storage silo" structures.  In Generals and Zero Hour, funds are collected by two methods: collection of supplies by specialised units and converted to money in "supply centers" or directly produced by specialised units, buildings, or tech buildings at a set interval of time.

All factions have structures and units with similar functions at their disposal. However, they are adjusted to fit each faction's theme and have somewhat varying properties. Units can be classified into infantry, vehicles, and aircraft, each with their own subdivisions (note: in the Red Alert series there is also naval craft available). Unit effectiveness against opponents follows the rock-paper-scissors (intransitivity) principle found in most real-time strategy games, and units' attack characteristics can vary according to faction.

Virtually every type of structure in the series acts as a tech tree node, and additional units, structures and faction-specific abilities will become available as new structures are built and placed. Access to advanced units and abilities may be temporarily blocked if the required structures are destroyed or if they are not being provided with adequate power by the supporting "power plant" structures.

Multiplayer
Each Command & Conquer game has included the ability to play multiplayer games against other players. Each box of Command & Conquer contained two CD copies of the game, making multiplayer gaming possible with a single purchase of the game. Westwood Studios advertised this on the packaging with the slogan "A second copy, so you and your friend can destroy each other." This resulted in Command & Conquer becoming the first RTS game title to feature competitive online play, and this is considered the most pertinent outside factor in the success of Command & Conquer. All games in the series up to Command & Conquer: Red Alert 2 featured two CDs that could be used for this reason. Later games did not.

Command & Conquer: Red Alert 3 was noted for being the first RTS game to enable the campaigns to be played cooperatively online; others had only supported single player campaigns. However, it was only possible to connect to other computers through EA's servers and not with LAN play.

Games produced by Westwood use the proprietary Westwood Online system to facilitate multiplayer games over the Internet; Renegade also supported GameSpy. Games under EA's development continued to use GameSpy, but dropped support for Westwood Online in favor of using EA's own servers. The GameSpy master servers have shut down in 2013., but some game titles can be played via Gameranger.

Games

Tiberian series
Command & Conquer, released on September 26, 1995, is the first game in the series and is considered as the title which originally defined and popularized the real-time strategy genre. Command & Conquer introduced the warring factions of the Global Defense Initiative (GDI) and the Brotherhood of Nod. Command & Conquer was well received and was widely praised by critics: "Command & Conquer is one of the finest, most brilliantly-designed computer games I have ever seen" said GameSpot reviewer Chris Hudak. Command & Conquer has attained 94% as an aggregate score from Metacritic with the less well received Covert Operations expansion pack obtaining an aggregate score of 72% after its 1996 release. The year in which C&C takes place is never specified in game but Command & Conquer: Renegade manual hints to take place between 2017 and 2020.

Command & Conquer: Tiberian Sun, released on August 27, 1999, takes place in the year 2030. While the original Command & Conquers plot was centered around an allegorical world politics setting, Tiberian Sun shifted this to a more science fiction-like setting against the apocalyptic background of Tiberium beginning to assimilate vast portions of the Earth's ecosystems. In 1998, Westwood Studios, the developers of Tiberian Sun, was acquired by Electronic Arts. However, EA had no direct part in the development of the title. Compared to its predecessor, Tiberian Sun relies heavily on science fiction technologies and introduces a new isometric game engine featuring varying level terrain to give the impression of a true 3D environment.

The full motion video is also scripted differently; while the cutscenes of Command & Conquer and Red Alert were filmed from a first-person perspective, Tiberian Sun used traditional cinematic shots for its FMVs featuring actors such as James Earl Jones and Michael Biehn.

Command & Conquer: Renegade, released February 26, 2002, takes place in the final days of the events of Command & Conquer and was the last Command & Conquer game to be created by Westwood Studios before their liquidation in 2003. Unlike any other games in the series, Renegade is a first-person shooter. Although receiving average reviews, with an aggregate score of 75% on both GameRankings and Metacritic, Renegade was praised for its online features. GameSpy awarded Renegade its 2002 "Wish it had been better" award, condemning the single player but saying that "C&C: Renegades multiplayer was innovative and fun". Online play was praised for encouraging teamwork and coordinated assaults, unlike other contemporary first-person shooters.

Command & Conquer 3: Tiberium Wars, released March 29, 2007, was a return to the real-time strategy roots of the Command & Conquer series. As a direct sequel to Tiberian Sun, Tiberium Wars is set in 2047 and features the introduction of a third faction, the Scrin. The sequel attained an aggregate score of 85% from both GameRankings and Metacritic. PC Gamer U.S. gave the game its "Editor's Choice" rating at 90%, stating that "one of the greatest RTS franchises of all time returns to glory", while PC Gamer UK gave it a more reserved rating of 82%, stating that it was "a welcome, but limited, return".

Shortly after the release of Tiberium Wars, the expansion pack Command & Conquer 3: Kane's Wrath was announced. Released on March 24, 2008, Kane's Wrath limited the player to only the Brotherhood of Nod in the campaign mode, though the original factions and six new sub-factions are available for the new strategic mode and skirmish mode. Reception was mainly positive with the expansion attaining an aggregate score of 77%.

Command & Conquer 4: Tiberian Twilight, released on March 16, 2010, saw a big change in gameplay from the previous Command & Conquer by removing the resource gathering and base building elements in previous games as well as the removal of the third faction, the Scrin. It is a direct sequel to Kane's Wrath (however not directly following on from its storyline), and is set in 2062, a time when Tiberium has advanced to its next evolutionary stage, and is rapidly spreading across Earth, making it soon to be uninhabitable.

Renegade X, is a free, fan-made remake of Command & Conquer: Renegade. The developers received approval from EA to release their game, and it entered open beta on February 26, 2014. Renegade X includes a short single-player campaign called Black Dawn.

Command & Conquer Remastered Collection. EA announced in November 2018 its plans to remaster Command & Conquer, including expansions and Red Alert, for modern computer systems through Petroglyph Games. It was released on June 5, 2020. The Remastered Collection received a score of 82/100 on Metacritic, with 48 positive, 10 mixed, and 0 negative reviews, indicating a "generally favorable" reception. Along with the release, EA also released the source code to the mod libraries for the base game and Red Alert into open source as to allow players to build improved mods for the games.

Red Alert series
Command & Conquer: Red Alert, released on November 22, 1996, is set in an alternate universe 1950s and was originally made to be the prequel to Command & Conquer establishing Red Alert as the prologue of the entire Tiberium series of games. Louis Castle has said that connecting Red Alert with the Tiberium series was a "failed experiment". Red Alert introduces the Allies and the Soviets as rival factions roughly analogous to NATO and the Warsaw Pact of the Cold War. The game was received well by critics and has the highest average score of any Command & Conquer game with an average of over 90% from GameRankings and Metacritic, unlike the title's two expansion packs, Red Alert: Counterstrike and Red Alert: The Aftermath of which both received below average reviews for the series with 63% and 70% average scores respectively. Both expansions gave the game more missions and more units. For PlayStation only, there was also a separate release to the original called Red Alert: Retaliation which included all the maps, missions and units of Red Alert: Counterstrike and Red Alert: The Aftermath as well as some newly filmed cut-scenes only available with Red Alert: Retaliation. Before being re-released as freeware on 31 August 2008 by Electronic Arts Command & Conquer: Red Alert had sold over three million copies.

Command & Conquer: Red Alert 2 was released on October 23, 2000. It featured a Soviet invasion of North America with tanks, conscripts, large airships, and psychically dominated anti-ship giant squid. Since that game lacked reference to the Tiberian series, the connection established in the first Red Alert game became unclear. However, it has been implied by the original creators of the series, now working at Petroglyph Games, that Red Alert 2 takes place in a parallel universe that came about as a result of time travel experiments taking place some time into the Tiberian series. Red Alert 2 was received fairly positively with an aggregate score of 86% from GameRankings.

An expansion pack to Red Alert 2, Command & Conquer: Yuri's Revenge was released on October 10, 2001. In Yuri's Revenge, an ex-Soviet figure named Yuri, tries to conquer the world using psychic technology and his own private army. The expansion pack received mostly positive reviews. GameRankings reports an average score of 85% based on 31 reviews, making Yuri's Revenge the best received expansion pack in the Command & Conquer series.

Command & Conquer: Red Alert 3, released on October 28, 2008, followed up on the story of Red Alert 2 and continued the series' more "light-hearted" take on Command & Conquer. It introduced many new comical units and the Empire of the Rising Sun faction, an anime inspired version of the Empire of Japan. Executive producer Chris Corry stated in a pre-release interview that Red Alert 3 will further differentiate the playable factions from each other and "[play] up the silliness in their faction design whenever possible". This approach was seen as popular with Red Alert 3 obtaining an aggregate score of 82% from Metacritic. A stand-alone expansion to Red Alert 3, Command & Conquer: Red Alert 3 – Uprising was released on March 12, 2009, to fairly poor reviews for the series with an average score of 64% from Metacritic. Another downloadable standalone game for the PlayStation 3 and Xbox 360 was released known as Command & Conquer: Red Alert 3 - Commander's Challenge which contained the Commander's Challenge mode of Uprising for consoles.

Command & Conquer: Red Alert was released on October 16, 2009, for iOS which was a continuation of the story of Red Alert 2 and takes place before Red Alert 3. It contained two factions, the Allies and Soviet Union with a third faction, the Empire of the Rising Sun, to be added in its expansion pack. This version of the game is not available in some regions (e.g. the UK).

The Chinese developer Tencent made a new iOS version of Red Alert, with a highly mixed reception from fans online.

Generals series
Command & Conquer: Generals, released on February 10, 2003, has a plotline which is unrelated to the other games of the Command & Conquer series. Generals is set in the near future and features the United States, China and the fictional terrorist organization, the Global Liberation Army. Generals uses an engine dubbed SAGE (or Strategy Action Game Engine) and is the first fully three-dimensional Command & Conquer real-time strategy game. After its release, Generals received mostly positive reviews. Based on 34 reviews, Metacritic gives it a score of 84/100 which includes a score of 9.3/10 from IGN. Generals has also received the E3 2002 Game Critics Awards Best Strategy Game award. One review noted that Generals was the first Command & Conquer real-time strategy game that did not include full-motion video cutscenes to tell the story and that it departed from the unique interface and base-building mechanics that had characterized all of the previous Command & Conquer RTS titles.

An expansion for Generals, Command & Conquer: Generals – Zero Hour, was released on September 22, 2003, to further the Generals storyline. Zero Hour added 9 new armies to the game, over a dozen new campaign missions, and a gameplay mode known as Generals Challenge. Unlike Generals, Zero Hour featured the return of full motion videos to the series. Zero Hour obtained much the same reception as Generals with an aggregate score of 85% and 84% from GameRankings and Metacritic respectively.

After EA Los Angeles started up their new internal group Danger Close and switched its focus to the Medal of Honor series, EA launched a new studio named Victory Games to continue the Command & Conquer franchise. On December 10, 2011, Electronic Arts posted that the next game in the series would be Command & Conquer: Generals 2. Three days later, a new browser-based, free-to-play MMO Command & Conquer game was also under development, under the name Command & Conquer: Tiberium Alliances. On December 15, Tiberium Alliances began a closed beta.

In August 2012, Generals 2 was repurposed to a free-to-play game known as simply Command & Conquer. The new game would have been based around the Generals franchise. However, following feedback from players who were able to play the alpha trial, the game was cancelled in October 2013. EA has said that the franchise will continue, but has given no other information at the time.

Recent

EA revealed Command & Conquer: Rivals, which was under development by the newly formed EA Redwood Studios and released for Android and iOS mobile devices in December 2018.

Petroglyph Games released  remastered versions of Red Alert and Command and Conquer in June 2020, where both games have been updated with features that improve gameplay for players while also including all expansions initially released for the games.

Chronology 
Westwood Studios (1995–2002)
 1995 – Command & Conquer 
 1996 – Command & Conquer – The Covert Operations
 1996 – Command & Conquer: Red Alert
 1997 – Command & Conquer: Red Alert – Counterstrike
 1997 – Command & Conquer: Red Alert – The Aftermath
 1998 – Command & Conquer: Red Alert – Retaliation
 1997 – Command & Conquer: Sole Survivor
 1999 – Command & Conquer: Tiberian Sun
 2000 – Command & Conquer: Tiberian Sun – Firestorm
 2000 – Command & Conquer: Red Alert 2
 2001 – Command & Conquer: Yuri's Revenge
 2002 – Command & Conquer: Renegade
EA Los Angeles (2003–2010)
 2003 – Command & Conquer: Generals
 2003 – Command & Conquer: Generals – Zero Hour
 2007 – Command & Conquer 3: Tiberium Wars
 2008 – Command & Conquer 3: Kane's Wrath
 2008 – Command & Conquer: Red Alert 3
 2009 – Command & Conquer: Red Alert 3 – Uprising
 2009 – Command & Conquer: Red Alert 3 – Commander's Challenge
 2010 – Command & Conquer 4: Tiberian Twilight
EA Phenomic (2011)
 2012 – Command & Conquer: Tiberium Alliances
EA Redwood Studios (2018–)
 2018 – Command & Conquer: Rivals
Petroglyph Games (2020)
 2020 – Command & Conquer Remastered Collection

See also canceled Command & Conquer games.

Music

Much of the music for the series was composed and produced by Westwood Studios' former sound director and video game music composer Frank Klepacki for the early games, with composition duties being taken on by several others following the liquidation of Westwood Studios in 2003. Klepacki returned to the series in 2008 to assist with the soundtrack for Red Alert 3.

The music has been received positively by critics, although praise was higher with earlier entries.

The original score for Command & Conquer: Red Alert was composed by Frank Klepacki and was voted the best video game soundtrack of 1996 by PC Gamer and Gameslice magazines. Among his most famous songs from the series is the theme of Red Alert, titled "Hell March", which accents the style of the game with adrenalized riffs of electric guitar, the sounds of marching feet, and synthesizers to a dramatic chant. Originally intended to be the theme for the Brotherhood of Nod faction in the Covert Operations expansion to the original 1995 Command & Conquer game, the track eventually ended up enlisting itself as a staple in the Red Alert series instead, and a second version of "Hell March" was specifically created for Command & Conquer: Red Alert 2.

Reception
The Command & Conquer series have been a commercial success with over 30 million Command & Conquer games sold as of 2009. In 1997, Screen Digest said it was "probably the world's biggest PC CD-ROM entertainment franchise to date."

Games in the series have nearly consistently scored highly on video game review aggregator websites GameRankings and Metacritic, which collect data from numerous review websites. As noted in the table below, the highest rated game is Command & Conquer with a score of 94% from Metacritic. The highest rated game averaged over both sites is Command & Conquer: Red Alert with an average of just over 90%. As a series, Command & Conquer games have averaged approximately 80% when including expansion packs and approximately 84% without.

Command & Conquers long history resulted in Guinness World Records awarding the series six world records in the Guinness World Records: Gamer's Edition 2008. These records include "Biggest Selling RTS Series", "Most Number of Platforms for an RTS", and "Longest Running Actor in Video Game Role" for Joe Kucan, who has played the part of Kane, the villainous mastermind of the series, for 15 years.

References

Notes

External links

 
 
 
 Command & Conquer Wiki

 
Alternate history video games
Electronic Arts franchises
Electronic Arts games
Real-time strategy video games
Science fiction video games
Military science fiction video games
Terrorism in fiction
Westwood Studios games
Video game franchises
Nintendo 64 games
Video game franchises introduced in 1995